The Map'yŏng Line is a non-electrified railway line of the Korean State Railway in T'aech'ŏn County, North P'yŏngan Province, North Korea, running from P'arwŏn on the Ch'ŏngnyŏn P'arwŏn Line to Hwŏnhwa. 

The line formerly continued from Hwŏnhwa to past the site of the T'aech'ŏn nuclear reactor, but that section was abandoned after construction of the reactor was halted in 1994; the line had also continued further on to Map'yŏng to assist with the construction of the large Taech'ŏn No. 2 Hydroelectric Power Station further up the Taeryŏng River.

Route 

A yellow background in the "Distance" box indicates that section of the line is not electrified.

References

Railway lines in North Korea
Standard gauge railways in North Korea